MoonBase Commander is a strategy video game released in 2002 by Humongous Entertainment. In it, the player controls a main hub, which can send out other hubs, attack enemy structures, create defensive buildings, and collect energy for further expansion; this is accomplished through launching buildings and/or weapons from a hub. Each building is connected to its parent hub by a cord, which can not overlap with other cords. The game features both single-player and multiplayer formats. It won the "Best of 2002: The Game No One Played" award from IGN.

Gameplay
The game is turn-based, allowing the player to spend a limited number of energy points per turn. The player can spend these energy points by attacking their opponents and/or adding more buildings to their base. Most units are ground-based and are attached by a cord to the unit that created them. Cords cannot overlap or land in water. Regardless of whether a unit is ground-based, all units need to be launched from their originating unit, similar to many artillery games. The power of a shot is not preset but determined by how long the player holds down on the launch button. The longer it is depressed, the farther the unit launches. Wind can also affect the accuracy of launching units. Game maps wrap around at the edges, meaning that no player is ever in a corner.

MoonBase Commander has four factions that can be played: NiceCo, DeWulf, System7, and Team Alpha. The factions are functionally identical with only cosmetic differences.

The Skirmish mode allows the player to fight up to three computer players of varying difficulty levels. The goal of a skirmish is to destroy all opposing players.

Challenge Mode consists of sixteen premade missions - four for each faction. Each challenge has different goals, enemies, and settings. The player earns a Gold, Silver, or Bronze medal upon completing a challenge, based mainly on how long it took them to complete it. The challenges progress linearly - when one challenge is complete, the next is unlocked. The credits are played when all the challenges have been completed.

Multiplayer
Although the game has built in LAN functionality, Internet play is only accessible through third-party software. Originally Internet play was only available through GameSpy, but the Moonbase Commander Console was created shortly after the release of the original game to overcome this limitation and eventually became the most common method for fans to play online. In 2013, the source code to the Moonbase Commander Console was released under the MIT License. There is another utility called MoonbaseIP that also bypasses the need for GameSpy along with MBCImport which allows for custom maps and export/import maps.

Development
MoonBase Commander was developed on the SCUMM engine, best known for its use in LucasArts adventure games.

Re-release
In early 2014, MoonBase Commander was re-released on Steam in its complete and unabridged form. It includes the full original gameplay, both single player campaigns and local (LAN) multi-player.

Reception and legacy
{{Video game reviews

| GR = 77.42%
| MC = 77

| IGN = 8/10<ref name="IGN">{{cite web |url=https://www.ign.com/games/moonbase-commander/pc-477995 |title='Moonbase Commander Review |author= |date= |publisher=IGN |access-date=June 1, 2015}}</ref>

| award1Pub = IGN
| award1 = "Best of 2002: The Game No One Played"
}}MoonBase Commander received mostly positive reviews on GameRankings and Metacritic respectively. It was praised by Tycho of Penny Arcade at the 2002 E3. Despite this, sales of the game were low, such that when an intellectual property valuation for Atari Interactive was performed in 2006, Moonbase Commander was estimated to be worth somewhere between $0 and $100,000. The rights to the MoonBase Commander franchise were sold at auction to Rebellion Developments following Atari's bankruptcy.

The editors of Computer Games Magazine presented MoonBase Commander with their 2002 "Best Budget Game" award. It won GameSpot''s annual "Best Game No One Played on PC" award.

References

External links
 

2002 video games
Windows games
Windows-only games
Humongous Entertainment games
Infogrames games
Turn-based strategy video games
Video games developed in the United States
Video games set on the Moon